Hosanagar was one of the seats in Karnataka Legislative Assembly in India. The seat ceased to exist after 2008 delimitation of constituencies.

Members of Assembly 
 1962 : Seat did not exist
 1967 : I Somasekharappa (INC)  
 1972 : 
 1978 : S. M. Sheeranaly Chandrasekhar (Indira Congress)
 1983 : B Swamy Rao (Janata Party) 
 1985 : B. Swamyrao (INC)
 2004 : Halappa H (BJP)
 2008 onwards : Seat does not exist.

Election results

1978 Assembly Election
 S. M. Sheeranaly Chandrasekhar (INC-I) : 28,092 votes    
 B. Swamyrao (Janata Party) : 24174

1985 Assembly Election
 B. Swamyrao (INC) : 35,155 votes    
 G. Nanjundappa (JNP) : 32694

2004 Assembly Election
 Halappa H (BJP) : 49,086 votes  
 Dr Narayanappa Gd (INC) : 32,235 votes

See also 
 List of constituencies of Karnataka Legislative Assembly

References 

Former assembly constituencies of Karnataka